The ANU College of Medicine, Biology and Environment is an  Australian university college for the study of medicine, biology, and environment at the Australian National University (ANU), located in Canberra, the capital city of Australia.

The College includes both undergraduate teaching departments and several research schools, with a focus upon different areas of the medical and health sciences and the impact of the environment. Together with the ANU College of Physical and Mathematical Sciences, the College is part of the Science, Environment, Medicine & Health faculty and includes the ANU Research School of Biology, the ANU Medical School and the John Curtin School of Medical Research, the Fenner School of Environment and Society, the Research School of Population Health, and the Research School of Psychology.

History
The College forebears were grounded in 1946 when the ANU was established by an Act of Federal Parliament, with medicine being one of the four founding research institutes. Through the influence of Howard Florey, in 1952 laboratories for the Research School of Physical Sciences were opened; and during the 1960s the Research School of Biology was established. By 1967, the University established the Research School of Chemistry and the Research School of Biological Sciences; and several years later, the Research School of Earth Sciences was created, separated from the Research School of Physical Science; and the Centre for Resources and Environmental Studies was established by Professor Frank Fenner. Formerly the ANU College of Medicine and Health Sciences, following independent reviews of the ANU disciplines of Chemistry and biosciences, the College was formed in August 2008.

Academic courses
The College offers undergraduate, post-graduate and honours academic courses and research degrees. Course offerings include the MChD (Latin: Medicinae ac Chirurgiae Doctoranda) program through the ANU Medical School; student in biology, chemistry, earth and marine sciences, environment and sustainability, medical and health sciences, psychology, and science.

Research
The College's academic research themes include applied epidemiology, biomedical science and biochemistry, chemistry, culture health and medicine, environment and resource management, epidemiology and population health, evolution, ecology and genetics, medical science and neuroscience, plant sciences, and psychology.

See also

Medical education in Australia

References

External links

Australian National University